Edise is a village in Jõhvi Parish, Ida-Viru County in northeastern Estonia. It is located just northwest of the town of Jõhvi.

References

Villages in Ida-Viru County